Andy Gatenby (born 9 April 1987) is a British actor, best known for his role in the crime film Nemesis (2021). He is also a former unbeaten professional boxer, holding a record of 6-0.

Boxing career

Retirement
Gatenby retired from boxing in 2014 over health concerns regarding an eye injury. A doctor reportedly discovered lacerations in his eye during a routine examination, and informed Andy that if he continued boxing he would risk causing a detached retina.

Acting career
In 2015 Gatenby took part in Special Forces: Ultimate Hell Week. The reality show was looking for the toughest civilian in the country and Gatenby reached the final of the six part series before being sent home for showing signs of aggression whilst being interrogated by the SAS. In 2018, Gatenby played the serial killer Cary Stayner on Sky TV's World's Most Evil Killers. In 2019, it was announced that Gatenby would appear in the sequel to The Krays: Marked for Death, the sequel to The Krays: Dead Man Walking, play the twins’ business advisor Leslie Payne.

In 2021, Gatenby made his feature film debut in the British crime film Nemesis as Bruce Payne's henchman, and joined an all star British cast including Billy Murray and Julian Glover. In late 2021, it was announced Gatenby would provide the voice over and motion capture for a character called Mannix Kriegger in the PlayStation 5 video game Dark Mean City. Gatenby has recently finished filming Renegades, an international action film directed by Daniel Zirilli where he played the role of Andre alongside Lee Majors, Danny Trejo and Patsy Kensit. The film is due to be released later in 2022.

Personal life
Gatenby is married with two children and is an ambassador for The Amelia-Mae Foundation, a charity that helps those affected by neuroblastoma. Gatenby's daughter Lexi appeared alongside him in the movie Nemesis.

Filmography

Film

Television

Video games

Music videos

References

External links
 
 Andy Gatenby's BoxRec Profile

1987 births
Living people